Antal Kagerbauer (born as Anton Kagerbauer; 5 July 1814 – 8 October 1872) was a Transylvanian Hungarian-German architect who worked in Cluj during the mid-nineteenth century.

Kagerbauer studied under György Winkler in the city of Cluj and then became his associate. After Winkler's death, Kagerbauer completed the St. George housing district (1834–36) and also the 'double barrelled' reformed church. Kagerbauer's design for a new city hall, built to replace the old one which was burnt down, was realised with some alterations in 1841. He also designed the church of St. Peter which was built between 1844 and 1846. He worked on various castles in the area also: the Banffy castle and marosujvari castle. The theatre building on Farkas street was also his work. In 1858 he planned the city's water system.

1814 births
1872 deaths
19th-century Hungarian architects
People from Abrud
Hungarian people of German descent